The Frisch Medal is an award in economics given by the Econometric Society. It is awarded every two years for empirical or theoretical applied research published in Econometrica during the previous five years. The award was named in honor of Ragnar Frisch, first co-recipient of the Nobel prize in economics and editor of Econometrica from 1933 to 1954. In the opinion of Rich Jensen, Gilbert F. Schaefer Professor of Economics and chairperson of the Department of Economics of the University of Notre Dame, "The Frisch medal is not only one of the top three prizes in the field of economics, but also the most prestigious 'best article' award in the profession". Five Frisch medal winners have also won the Nobel Prize.

Winners
 2022 – Giulia Brancaccio, Myrto Kalouptsidi, Theodore Papageorgiou for their paper, "Geography, Transportation, and Endogenous Trade Costs”, (Econometrica, Vol. 88, No. 2, March 2020, 657–691). 
 2020 –Kate Ho and Robin Lee for their paper, "Insurer Competition in Health Care Markets”, (Econometrica, Vol. 85, No. 2, March 2017, 379–417).
 2018 – Gabriel M. Ahlfeldt, Stephen J. Redding, Daniel M. Sturm, and Nikolaus Wolf for 
 2016 – Benjamin Handel, Igal Hendel, and Michael Whinston for 
 2014 – Flávio Cunha, James Heckman, and Susanne Schennach for 
 2012 – Joseph P. Kaboski and Robert M. Townsend for 
 2010 – Nicholas Bloom for 
 2008 – David Card and Dean R. Hyslop for 
 2006 – Fabien Postel-Vinay and Jean-Marc Robin for 
 2004 – Jonathan Eaton and Samuel Kortum for 
 2002 – Ricardo J. Caballero and Eduardo Engel for 
 2000 – Richard Blundell, Alan S. Duncan, and Costas Meghir for 
 1998 – Robert M. Townsend for 
 1996 – Steven T. Berry for 
 1994 – Larry G. Epstein and Stanley E. Zin for 
 1992 – John Rust for 
 1990 – David M. Newbery for 
 1988 – Ariel Pakes for 
 1986 – Jeffrey A. Dubin and Daniel L. McFadden for 
 1984 – Lars Peter Hansen and Kenneth J. Singleton for 
 1982 – Orley Ashenfelter for 
 1980 – Jerry A. Hausman and David A. Wise for 
 1978 – Angus S. Deaton for

See also

 List of economics awards

References

External links
 Award page on the official site of the Econometric Society 

Economics awards
Econometric Society